Children of the Storm (2003) is the 15th in a series of historical mystery novels, written by Elizabeth Peters and featuring fictional sleuth and archaeologist Amelia Peabody.

Explanation of the novel's title
The title is an excerpt from an ancient Egyptian horoscope:
"The day of the children of the storm. Very dangerous. Do not go on the water this day."

Plot summary

The 1919 season opens with the Vandergelts and Emersons packing the God's Wives treasures found (in the previous book) for Cyrus Vandergelt by his adopted son Bertie. Just after the Service d'Antiquités representative comes to inspect their work, several items disappear together with the conservator Cyrus had hired on Sethos's recommendation. The conservator's skeleton is found later in the desert, without the objects.  These events coincide with a visit from Emerson's brother Walter, his wife Evelyn, their daughter Lia and her husband David (the Emersons' adoptive son), plus their small children.

Meanwhile, the Emersons meet up with  Justin Fitzroyce, a young person with a strange mental malady, and his companion, François, who quickly develops a dislike of the family after Ramses mistakes his attentions to the boy for physical abuse.  Justin is travelling with his grandmother, the elderly, sometimes confused, Mrs Fitzroyce; also with them is her companion, who turns out to be Maryam, the teenage daughter of Sethos, fallen on hard times. Amelia tries to befriend Maryam and helps her to rebuild her relationship with her father when he arrives to visit.  She also reassures Maryam that the Emersons were not responsible for the death of the girl's mother, Bertha.

Along the way, the Emerson family is dogged by a series of mysterious events ranging from strange pranks to near-fatal accidents.  Most of these seem to be directed at the Arab servants, including Selim, who is badly injured when a motor-car imported by Emerson crashes as a result of the wheel-nuts having been removed.  The exception is a mystery attacker who targets Maryam.  In addition, Ramses is temporarily taken prisoner and drugged by a mysterious woman disguised as the goddess Hathor.  The same woman later reappears at the temple ruins during the night but the Emersons fail to apprehend her.

As the head of the Service arrives to take possession of the treasure for transport to Cairo, Nefret is captured by the criminal gang intent on stealing the treasure, and held prisoner on the dahabeeyah belonging to the FitzRoyces, as is Emerson when he impetuously comes to rescue her. "Justin" is revealed as Maryam's elder half-sister and "Mrs FitzRoyce" as an old associate of Bertha's.  Through Emerson's efforts, Nefret escapes through a window of the boat, to be picked up by passing fishermen; meanwhile Maryam, who is implicated in the plot, shows her true loyalties by rescuing Emerson.

The final chase scene has Amelia, Rameses, Sethos, Selim, Daoud, Cyrus, Walter, and Bertie racing down-river armed to the teeth to rescue Nefret and Emerson, and is unlike any other scene in the Amelia series.

Characters in "Children of the Storm"
This book is notable in that the entire Emerson clan is present: Professor and Amelia Emerson, Walter and Evelyn Emerson, Ramses and Nefret Emerson and their children David John and Charla, Sennia Emerson, David and Lia Todros and their children Dolly and Evie, Sethos, and Maryam. It is also in this book that Sethos finally reveals his given name (Seth), to Evelyn.

See also

List of characters in the Amelia Peabody series

Amelia Peabody
2003 novels
Fiction set in 1919
Novels set in Egypt